Kyösti Hämäläinen (born 16 September 1945 in Helsinki) is a Finnish rally driver. He contested 19 World Rally Championship events, winning the 1977 1000 Lakes Rally overall. Hämäläinen also won 13 Finnish Rally Championship titles between 1973 and 1986.

Career
Hämäläinen began his career in 1965 by taking part in ice racing events with rental cars. In 1969, he moved to rallying and in 1973 took his Finnish Rally Championship championship in group 1, driving an Alfa Romeo 2000 GTV. He followed it up with four consecutive Group 1 titles between 1975 and 1978, using a Sunbeam Avenger(1975) and Ford Escort(1976,1977,1978). In 1978 Hämäläinen moved to Group 2 and won eight consecutive Finnish Championships with a Ford Escort, from 1979 to 1986.

Hämäläinen's career in the World Rally Championship consisted mainly of his entries into 1000 Lakes Rally, which was also part of the Finnish Rally Championship. His first WRC start was the 1973 1000 Lakes Rally, in which he retired. 1977 was the most successful year of Hämäläinen's WRC career, including an unexpected victory in the 1000 Lakes Rally, a 5th-place finish in International Swedish Rally and a 6th place in Lombard RAC Rally.

Complete WRC results

External links
 Rallybase Data page
 Juwra Data page

Living people
Finnish rally drivers
World Rally Championship drivers
1945 births
Sportspeople from Helsinki
20th-century Finnish people